The 2018 Shanghai Rolex Masters was a tennis tournament played on outdoor hard courts. It was the tenth edition of the Shanghai ATP Masters 1000, classified as an ATP World Tour Masters 1000 event on the 2018 ATP World Tour. It took place at Qizhong Forest Sports City Arena in Shanghai, China from October 7 to 14, 2018.

Points and prize money

Point distribution

Prize money

Singles main-draw entrants

Seeds
The following are the seeded players. Seedings are based on ATP rankings as of October 1, 2018. Rankings and points before are as of October 8, 2018.

† The player did not qualify for the tournament in 2017. Accordingly, points for his 18th best result are deducted instead.

Withdrawals
The following players would have been seeded, but they withdrew from the event.

† Fognini is entitled to use an exemption to skip the tournament and substitute his 18th best result (90 points) in its stead. Accordingly, his points after the tournament will remain unchanged.

Other entrants
The following players received wildcards into the singles main draw:
 Li Zhe
 Stan Wawrinka
 Wu Yibing
 Zhang Ze

The following players received entry from the qualifying draw:
 Taylor Fritz
 Hubert Hurkacz
 Bradley Klahn
 Mikhail Kukushkin
 Mackenzie McDonald
 Benoît Paire
 Vasek Pospisil

Withdrawals
Before the tournament
 Grigor Dimitrov → replaced by  Andreas Seppi
 Fabio Fognini → replaced by  Matthew Ebden
 David Goffin → replaced by  Jérémy Chardy
 John Isner → replaced by  Robin Haase
 Philipp Kohlschreiber → replaced by  Mischa Zverev
 Rafael Nadal → replaced by  Alex de Minaur
 Lucas Pouille → replaced by  Peter Gojowczyk
 Fernando Verdasco → replaced by  Maximilian Marterer

Retirements
 Juan Martín del Potro

Doubles main-draw entrants

Seeds

 Rankings are as of October 1, 2018

Other entrants
The following pairs received wildcards into the doubles main draw:
 Gong Maoxin /  Zhang Ze
 Li Zhe /  Di Wu

Withdrawals
Before the tournament
 Nikoloz Basilashvili

Champions

Singles

  Novak Djokovic def.  Borna Ćorić, 6–3, 6–4

Doubles

 Łukasz Kubot /  Marcelo Melo def.  Jamie Murray /  Bruno Soares, 6–2, 6–4

References

External links
Official Website

 
Shanghai ATP Masters 1000
Shanghai Masters (tennis)
Shanghai Rolex Masters
Shanghai Masters